Eifion Lewis-Roberts (born 13 February 1981 in St Asaph, Denbighshire, Wales) is a former Welsh international rugby union player.  A Prop forward, Roberts was selected for the Wales national rugby union team for the Autumn internationals series in October 2008, playing his first game on 14 November against Canada.  Roberts is a fluent Welsh speaker.

On 18 January 2010 he was named in the 35-man Wales national Squad for the 2010 Six Nations Championship.

Despite interest from clubs in the Celtic League and the French Top 14, Lewis-Roberts signed a three-year contract with Sale Sharks in March 2010. In September the same year, early in the season, Lewis-Roberts suffered an injury to the anterior cruciate ligament in his knee in a match against Harlequins. As Lewis-Robert required re-constructive surgery on his knee, he was expected to miss most of the season. He signed for French Top 14 outfit Toulon in 2011 reuniting with Philippe Saint-Andre his former coach at Sale. At the end of the 2011–12 season he returned to Sale Sharks as part of a deal which saw Andrew Sheridan go in the other direction to Toulon.

Lewis-Roberts retired from rugby in September 2017 after suffering a knee injury.

References

External links
Sale Sharks profile

1981 births
Living people
British expatriates in France
Expatriate rugby union players in France
Rugby union players from Denbighshire
Sale Sharks players
Sportspeople from St Asaph
Wales international rugby union players
Welsh expatriate rugby union players
Welsh rugby union players
Rugby union props